My Geeky Nerdy Buddies is a 2014 mainland Chinese-Taiwanese romantic comedy film directed by Kevin Chu. It was released on July 10, 2014, in China but the film was withdrawn on the next day, citing "malicious competition" from the studio Bona Film Group. The film stars Jam Hsiao as A Zhai, and Jiang Shuying as Yaling.

Summary
Otaku and his roommate Mr. Cheap are known as the ultimate geeks of their university. However, like any normal guy, their goal is to fall in love with the girls of their dreams. To get close to his goddess Mei, Mr. Cheap pretends to be a spoiled rich kid, appearing everywhere she goes. Meanwhile, the introverted Otaku tries to create a chance to talk to class beauty Ling by running into her in the hallway, only to have his plan fail awkwardly.

Cast
Jam Hsiao as A Zhai 阿宅
Jiang Shuying as Yaling 雅玲
Da Peng as Kou Nan 摳男
Xie Na as Chuan Mei 川美
Chen Bor-jeng as Lao Zhai 老宅
Cai Weijia as Gao Gao Di 高高迪
Chang Chin-lan as A Mei 阿梅
Shanny A
Popping Kuang
Matt Wu as Wu Shouzheng 吳守正
Tony Chen
Lin Mei-hsiu as Yaling's mom 雅玲媽

Reception
It has grossed NT$5.02 million in Taipei.

References

2014 romantic comedy films
Chinese romantic comedy films
Films directed by Kevin Chu
Hong Kong romantic comedy films
Taiwanese romantic comedy films
2010s Hong Kong films
2010s Mandarin-language films